Ponnya (1812 - ), known honorifically as U Ponnya,  was one of Burma's most prominent dramatists. Ponnya is considered one of Burma's greatest literary figures, known for his elegant wit and clarity of language.

Biography
Ponnya was born in 1812 to the Ponnya Thaman family, a prominent chieftain family in the town of Sale (also spelt Salay), in present-day Magway Region. Ponnya was educated at the Bhamo monastic college in Amarapura.

As a Konbaung Dynasty court playwright during the 19th century, he is primarily known for his morality tales. Ponnya served as one of King Mindon Min's court poets. He gained prominence after joined Prince Kanaung Mintha's establishment in the 1850s, becoming known for his literary talent.

Throughout his prolific career, he wrote seven plays, primarily based on the Buddhist jatakas, as well as poems and songs, more than 30 Buddhist prose works, and treatises in fields ranging from medicine to astrology. Ponnya also revived a 15th-century genre in Burmese literature, the myittasa, a form of verse letter. Because of his writing skills, he is called as Myanmar's Shakespeare by modern people. He also described himself: "Because my poetry intelligence always comes out when extracted".

The royal government conferred him the title "Minhla Thinkhaya" and granted him the Ywazi village as his appanage..His writer rival is Achote Tann Sayar Phay.

He was accused of being with the resistance and was taken to the house of Myowun U Thar Oe(),and was killed by him. Not being able to withstand the loss, King Mindon of Burma quoted his death "A dog killing a man".

List of works

Wizaya Pyazat
Padoma Pyazat
Yethe Pyazat
Kawthala Pyazat
Wathudewa Pyazat

References

1812 births
1867 deaths
Burmese writers
Konbaung dynasty
Burmese dramatists and playwrights
Burmese male poets
People of the Second Anglo-Burmese War
19th-century Burmese poets
19th-century dramatists and playwrights
19th-century male writers